AKT2, also known as RAC-beta serine/threonine-protein kinase, is an enzyme that in humans is encoded by the AKT2 gene. It influences metabolite storage as part of the insulin signal transduction pathway.

Function 

This gene is a putative oncogene encoding a protein belonging to the AKT subfamily of serine/threonine kinases that contain SH2-like (Src homology 2-like) domains.  The encoded protein is a general protein kinase capable of phosphorylating several known proteins.

AKT2 has important roles in controlling glycogenesis, gluconeogenesis, and glucose transport as part of the insulin signal transduction pathway.

Clinical significance 

The gene was shown to be amplified and overexpressed in 2 of 8 ovarian carcinoma cell lines and 2 of 15 primary ovarian tumors. Overexpression contributes to the malignant phenotype of a subset of human ductal pancreatic cancers.

Mice lacking Akt2 have a normal body mass, but display a profound diabetic phenotype, indicating that Akt2 plays a key role in signal transduction downstream of the insulin receptor. Mice lacking Akt2 show worse outcome in breast cancer initiated by the large T antigen as well as the neu oncogene.

Interactions
AKT2 has been shown to interact with:

 APPL1, 
 CHUK,
 SH3RF1  and
 TCL1A.

References

Further reading

External links
 
 

EC 2.7.11
Protein kinases